Pagwa is an unincorporated place and railway point in geographic Bicknell Township in Unorganized North Cochrane District in northeastern Ontario, Canada. It is named for the Pagwachuan River.

A now abandoned airfield, created by the Department of National Defence in the mid-1930s in part using 47,047 person-days of unemployment relief labour, lies on the north of rail line. A Frontier College instructor was located at the construction camp. The airfield became in the late 1930s part of a string of emergency landing sites for Trans-Canada Air Lines (today Air Canada) to support their transcontinental flight operations. From 1952 to 1966, the airfield was USAF Pagwa Air Station and then RCAF Station Pagwa, and operated as part of the Pinetree Line and other subsequent continental defence systems.

Pagwa is also on Airfield Creek, part of the James Bay drainage basin, which flows via the Pagwachuan River, Kenogami River and Albany River to James Bay.

First Nations
Constance Lake First Nation, an Oji-Cree First Nation, is home to close to 1,500 members of Ojibway and Cree ancestry. who lived in Pagwa prior to being relocated to their current location. The Constance Lake First Nation is historically linked to the English River band, classified as a branch of the Albany band, by the Treaty 9 Canadian federal officials in 1905. Prior to Treaty 9, according to a 1901 Canadian census, there were 85 people inhabiting the English River area.:

Between 1925-1940, many families from English River, Fort Albany and Moose Factory re-located to Pagwa (nearby the present-day Constance Lake First Nation) to follow employment opportunities. Pagwa, named for the Pagwachuan River, one of the largest rivers in Northern Ontario, was valued by First Nations and the North-West fur traders, as an access, along with the Albany River, to James Bay and Hudson Bay. Pagwachuan is a Cree word meaning shallow river. Pagwa, a railway divisional point, had a fur trading post, as it was at a major junction of the railway and the Pagwachuan River. Packet steamers ran between Pagwa and James Bay to serve the Revillon Freres trading post and community early in the 1900s. By May 1940 the majority of the English River First Nation resided at Pagwa as the English River reserve was "uninhabitable", according to Reverend Clarke who had requested funding for a new school at Pagwa. In 1943 the Department of Indian Affairs began to consider the creation of a new Band for those living at Pagwa which included members of Albany and Moose Factory (Attawapiskat) Bands who also resided at Pagwa. In the 1940s, Constance Lake First Nation "absorbed essentially the whole of the English River Band and also members of the Albany and Moose Factory Bands who lived nearby."

References

External links
The History of Pagwa - Richard Cameron, 2002

Communities in Cochrane District